This is a list of seasons completed by the Birmingham Bulls American football team, currently of the BAFA National Leagues (BAFANL). The list documents the season-by-season records of the Bulls' franchise from 1985 to present, including postseason achievements.

The Bulls were founded in 1983 and first entered league competition in 1984. They have won 4 national championships and 19 division championships, although their last success in either forum came in 2006, last making the play-offs in 2011. Throughout their history, they have gone undefeated three times, and had no winless seasons.

They appeared in the inaugural 1986 Bud Bowl against the Glasgow Lions, and in Bud Bowl III against the London Olympians, winning both times. In 1991, they again defeated the London Olympians in the NDMA Coke Bowl and defeated them for a third time in the 1995 BAFA Division 1 Bowl. They were defeated by the Manchester Spartans in Bud Bowl IV in 1989, and by the London Olympians in the 1994 BAFA Division 1 Bowl and both the 1999 and 2000 BSL Division 1 Bowl.

Seasons

Notes

External links
Official Site
Birmingham Bulls Facebook page
Birmingham Bulls Twitter account

Birmingham Bulls (American football)
Birmingham Bulls seasons